Peter Kaiser (born 1987) is an American dog musher who won the 2019 Iditarod Trail Sled Dog Race. Kaiser is the first Yup’ik musher and the fifth Alaska Native to win an Iditarod championship. He is from Bethel, Alaska.

Kaiser graduated from Bethel High School in 2005. He works in construction, and fishes and hunts. He is married and has two children.

Career
Kaiser finished 28th in the 2010 Iditarod, his rookie year in the event, then finished eighth in 2011 and fifth in 2012. He has six top 10 finishes in 10 Iditarods.

Kaiser also won the Kuskokwim 300 championship six times.

The Kuskokwim 300, a highly regarded mid-distance race, figured prominently in his decision to become a competitive musher. “Our family has always had dogs, and I’ve been mushing since I was a kid," he said on his Iditarod bio. "Watching the Kuskokwim 300 every January sparked my interest in long distance racing, and a few years ago, I decided that I would give the Iditarod a try."

Career summary
Kaiser and his dog teams have finished fifth or better in 18 sled dog races since 2005. Here's a list of his first-place finishes:
 2022 Kuskokwim 300
 2020 Kuskokwim 300
 2019 Iditarod
 2018 Kuskokwim 300
 2017 Kuskokwim 300
 2016 Kuskokwim 300
 2016 Denali Doubles
 2015 Kuskokwim 300
 2013 Norton Sound 450 
 2012 Norton Sound 450 
 2011 Kobuk 440
 2008 Bogus Creek 150
 2005 Akiak Dash 65

References

1987 births
Dog mushers from Alaska
Iditarod champions
Living people
People from Bethel, Alaska
Yupik people